WJEC (106.5 FM) is a radio station licensed to serve Vernon, Alabama, United States.  The station, which began broadcasting in 1994, is currently owned by Lamar County Broadcasting Co., Inc.

WJEC broadcasts Classic Country and WVSA broadcast Southern Gospel music format.

History
This station received its original construction permit for a 3,000-watt station at 106.5 MHz from the Federal Communications Commission on August 16, 1989. The new station was assigned the call letters WJEC by the FCC on September 20, 1989. After a modification to increase the station's effective radiated power to 6,000 watts and one time extension, WJEC received its license to cover from the FCC on August 10, 1994.

In April 1996, an agreement was reached to transfer the broadcast license for WJEC to Lamar County Broadcasting Co., Inc., an Alabama corporation.  The deal was approved by the FCC on July 2, 1996, and the transaction was consummated on July 16, 1996.

References

External links

Southern Gospel radio stations in the United States
Radio stations established in 1994
Lamar County, Alabama
1994 establishments in Alabama
JEC